Tug of War is the third solo studio album by English musician Paul McCartney, released on 26 April 1982. It was McCartney's first album released after the dissolution of Wings the previous year. Overall, it was his 11th album since the break up of the Beatles. It was also McCartney's first album after the murder of former songwriting partner John Lennon. The cover features an abstract oil painting by the artist Brian Clarke, a frequent McCartney collaborator, incorporating an over-painted transparency of a portrait of Paul taken by Linda McCartney.

Tug of War was produced by former Beatles producer George Martin and was a number one hit in many countries, selling over one million copies in the United States in the year of its release. Some critics hailed it as a return to form for McCartney. Its remastered deluxe edition received a nomination for Best Boxed or Special Limited Edition Package at the 2017 Grammy Awards.

Recording 
Following the release of the solo album McCartney II, Wings regrouped in July and October 1980 to rehearse several songs which later appeared on Tug of War and Pipes of Peace. Feeling the need for direction, McCartney called upon his former producer, George Martin, to begin recording a song written for the animated Rupert Bear character (to which McCartney acquired the film rights in 1970), titled "We All Stand Together", among others. The productive sessions continued until 9 December, the morning McCartney woke up to discover his former songwriting partner and fellow ex-Beatle, John Lennon, had been shot and killed in New York City on the previous night. Abandoning that day's session (in which he and Denny Laine were recording future B-side "Rainclouds") part-way through, both Martin and McCartney felt it was best to leave the project for the time being and start anew once they were ready.

In February 1981, two months after Lennon's death, McCartney resumed the sessions, recording that month with Stevie Wonder, Stanley Clarke, Carl Perkins and Ringo Starr, and laying down several songs in the process. The sessions were held at AIR Studios in Montserrat, in the Caribbean, and lasted from 3 February to 2 March, ending with "Ebony and Ivory" and "What's That You're Doing", two songs featuring Stevie Wonder. 10cc guitarist Eric Stewart also became a frequent collaborator of McCartney during this period. Further sessions were undertaken that summer at Martin's AIR studios in Oxford Street, London. The sessions were so productive that several resulting tracks were held over for McCartney's next album, Pipes of Peace, which followed in 1983. The rest of 1981 was spent in a quiet fashion, with McCartney and Martin giving finishing touches to the album.

Release, critical reception and aftermath 

In a contemporary review for Rolling Stone, music critic Stephen Holden hailed Tug of War as "the masterpiece everyone has always known Paul McCartney could make", and particularly admired its vivid music and consistent songwriting. Robert Palmer was less enthusiastic in his review for The New York Times, and found the album "exquisitely crafted though lyrically flawed", as he thought McCartney's lyrics were often "clichéd or mawkish", but that the album "at its best, is as finely crafted as his work with the Beatles".

In March 1982, McCartney's duet with Stevie Wonder, "Ebony and Ivory", was released to considerable commercial success, reaching number one in many countries. Tug of War followed in April, and similarly became a worldwide number one. The follow-up single, "Take It Away", reached the top ten in the United States. The album restored McCartney's critical reputation after what was viewed as a lean period for him. Tug of War was nominated for the "Album of the Year" Grammy in 1983. Wingspan author Mark Lewisohn thought it was a better album than Band on the Run.

The album was issued in the US on compact disc on 29 February 1984. In 1993, Tug of War was remastered and re-issued on CD as part of The Paul McCartney Collection series. There were no bonus tracks: "Rainclouds" and "I'll Give You a Ring", B-sides of "Ebony and Ivory" and "Take It Away", respectively, were omitted. In 2007, Tug of War was remastered and re-released on the iTunes Store adding a solo version of "Ebony and Ivory".

A further reissue of Tug of War was released on 2 October 2015, as part of the Paul McCartney Archive Collection. This edition included a remixed version of the album, along with the original mix, and a series of videos.

Track listing 
All songs were written by Paul McCartney, except "What's That You're Doing?" co-written by Stevie Wonder.

Side one
"Tug of War" – 4:22
"Take It Away" – 4:14
"Somebody Who Cares" – 3:19
"What's That You're Doing?"  – 6:19
"Here Today" – 2:27

Side two
"Ballroom Dancing" – 4:07
"The Pound Is Sinking" – 2:54
"Wanderlust" – 3:49
"Get It"  – 2:29
"Be What You See (Link)" – 0:34
"Dress Me Up as a Robber" – 2:41
"Ebony and Ivory"  – 3:46

Archive Collection Reissue
In 2015 the album was re-issued by Hear Music/Concord Music Group as part of the sixth set of releases, alongside Pipes of Peace, in the Paul McCartney Archive Collection. It was released in multiple formats:

Standard Edition 2-CD; remixed version of the original 12-track album on the first disc, plus 11 bonus tracks on a second disc.
Deluxe Edition 3CD/1DVD Box Set + 112 page essay book and 64 page scrapbook; 
Super Deluxe CD/DVD 3CD/1DVD Box Set + 112 page essay book and 64 page scrapbook + limited edition acrylic slipcase
Remastered vinyl The albums will also be available on special gatefold vinyl editions (vinyl editions include a download card).

Digital
Standard:
Standard Res – without Ebooklet
Standard Res – with Ebooklet
Mastered for iTunes – without Ebooklet
Hi-Res – 24-bit/96 kHz – with Ebooklet

Deluxe:
Standard Res (with or without Ebooklet)
Mastered for iTunes (with Ebooklet)
Hi-Res – 24-bit/96 kHz (with Ebooklet)

Disc 1 – Remixed album
Remixed version of the original 12-track album.

Disc 2 – Original album remastered (deluxe edition only)
The original 12-track album.

Bonus Audio (disc 2 for standard version, disc 3 for deluxe edition)

All songs written by Paul McCartney except "Rainclouds" written with Denny Laine.

"Stop, You Don't Know Where She Came From"  – 1:44
"Wanderlust"   – 1:46
"Ballroom Dancing"   – 2:04
"Take It Away"   – 5:37
"The Pound Is Sinking"   – 2:35
"Something That Didn't Happen"   – 2:17
"Ebony and Ivory"   – 1:46
"Dress Me Up as a Robber/Robber Riff"   – 3:42
"Ebony and Ivory"  – 3:50
"Rainclouds"  – 3:13
"I'll Give You a Ring"  – 3:09

Note: Tracks 1-8 previously unreleased.

Additional download tracks available via paulmccartney.com
"Take It Away"  – 4:05

Disc 4 – DVD
"Tug of War" Music Video 
"Tug of War" Music Video 
"Take It Away" Music Video
"Ebony and Ivory" Music Video
"Fly TIA" – Behind The Scenes on Take It Away

Personnel 
Track numbering refers to CD and digital releases of the album.

 Paul McCartney – arrangements, vocals, backing vocals (1–4, 6–9, 11, 12); synthesizers (1, 7, 9, 12); acoustic guitar (1–3, 7–9); electric guitar (1, 4, 6, 7); bass guitar (1, 2, 4, 6, 8, 9, 11, 12); drums (1, 4, 6, 7); acoustic piano (2, 6, 8, 12); Spanish guitar (3); guitars (5, 10–12), percussion (6, 9, 12); vocoder (10, 12)
 George Martin – arrangements, Fender Rhodes (2, 11)
 Stevie Wonder – vocals, backing vocals and synthesizers (4, 12); Fender Rhodes, drums and percussion (12)
 Denny Laine – electric guitar (1, 6, 11); guitar synthesizer (3); acoustic guitar (7); bass guitar (8); synthesizers (11)
 Eric Stewart – electric guitar (1); backing vocals (1–4, 6–8)
 Carl Perkins – electric guitar and vocals (9)
 Stanley Clarke – bass guitar (3, 7)
 Campbell Maloney – military snare drum (1)
 Steve Gadd – drums (2, 3); percussion (3)
 Ringo Starr – drums (2)
 Adrian Sheppard – drums and percussion (8)
 Dave Mattacks – drums and percussion (11)
 Kenneth Sillito – orchestra conductor (1)
 Adrian Brett – pan pipes (1)
 Andy Mackay – Lyricon (4)
 Jack Brymer – clarinet (6)
 Keith Harvey – cello (5)
 Ian Jewel – viola (5)
 Bernard Partridge – violin (5)
 Jack Rothstein – violin (5)
 Philip Jones Brass Ensemble – brass section (8)
 Linda McCartney – backing vocals (1–4, 6–8, 11)
 Peter Marshall – narrator (6)

Production 
 George Martin – producer
 Geoff Emerick – engineer 
 Jon Jacobs – assistant engineer 
 Mike Stavrou – assistant engineer
 Alex Wharton – mastering 
 Hipgnosis – cover coordination
 Sinc – cover coordination
 YES – creative direction, design 
 Brian Clarke – cover painting 
 Linda McCartney – photography

Accolades

Grammy Awards 

|-
| width="35" align="center" rowspan="5"|1983 || Tug of War || Album of the Year || 
|-
|rowspan=3| "Ebony and Ivory" (Duet with Stevie Wonder) || Song of the Year || 
|-
| Record of the Year || 
|-
| Best Pop Vocal Performance – Duo or Group || 
|-
| "What's That You're Doing?"(Duet with Stevie Wonder) || Best R&B Vocal Performance – Duo or Group || 
|-
| width="35" align="center" rowspan="1"|2017 || Tug of War (Remastered Deluxe Edition) || Best Boxed or Special Limited Edition Package || 
|-

American Music Awards 

|-
|  style="width:35px; text-align:center;" rowspan="2"|1983 || Paul McCartney (performer) || Favorite Pop/Rock Male Artist|| 
|-
| "Ebony and Ivory"(Duet with Stevie Wonder) || Favorite Pop/Rock Single || 
|-

Brit Awards 

|-
| width="35" align="center" rowspan="3"|1983|| rowspan=2| Paul McCartney (performer)|| Best British Male Artist || 
|-
| Sony Trophy for Technical Excellence || 
|-
| George Martin (producer) || Best British Producer || 
|-

Charts

Weekly charts

Year-end charts

Certifications and sales

Notes
A^ In the United States, Tug of War also entered the R&B chart, peaking at No. 11 there.
B^ Until January 1987, Japanese albums chart had been separated into LP, CD, and cassette charts. Tug of War also entered the cassette chart, peaking at No. 12 and entering top 100 for 19 weeks.
C^ Combined sales of LP, CD, and audio cassette.

References

External links
 
 JPGR's Beatles site: Paul McCartney's Tug of War

Paul McCartney albums
1982 albums
Albums produced by George Martin
Parlophone albums
Albums recorded at AIR Studios